Hermann Lebert (born Hermann Lewy, 9 June 1813 – 1 August 1878) was a German physician and naturalist.

Lebert was born in Breslau. He studied medicine and the natural sciences first in Berlin and later in Zurich under Johann Lukas Schönlein. After he received his medical doctorate (Zurich, 1834), he traveled throughout Switzerland, studying botany. For the next year and a half he studied in Paris, particularly under Baron Guillaume Dupuytren and Pierre Charles Alexandre Louis. In 1838 he settled in Bex, later changing between Bex and Paris. From 1842 to 1845 he worked mainly in comparative anatomy, which had interested him during his travels as a student on the coast of Normandy and the Channel Islands with Charles-Philippe Robin. On a government assignment, he collected specimens for Musée Orfila. After a stay in Berlin during the winter of 1845–1846 Lebert settled in Paris, where he devoted his efforts to both his practice and scientific work. In 1853 he accepted an invitation to become professor of clinical medicine in Zurich, and six years later he moved on to Breslau, where he held the same job. In 1862, he was elected as a member to the American Philosophical Society. In 1874 he returned to Bex, Switzerland, where he spent the rest of his life. 

Lebert was among the first to use the microscope in pathological anatomy, and thus contributed importantly to both pathology and clinical medicine.

Selected writings 
 Physiologie pathologique. 2 volumes and atlas. Paris, Baillière, 1845. (An early work on pathological histology that was instrumental in introducing the cellular idea of pathology).
 Traité d’anatomie pathologique générale et spéciale. 2 volumes. Paris, Baillière, 1857 and 1861. (Known for its excellent hand-coloured copperplate engravings of macro- and micropathology).

References

External links 
 Hermann Lebert @ Who Named It

19th-century German physicians
German pathologists
German arachnologists
1813 births
1878 deaths
Academic staff of the University of Breslau
Academic staff of the University of Zurich
University of Zurich alumni
Physicians from Wrocław
19th-century Swiss physicians